The Charlie Davis Orchestra was a jazz band from Indiana that was active in the 1920s and 1930s. For a while the band's vocalist was Dick Powell.

History
One of the most famous bands in the Hoosier state at the time, the Charlie Davis Orchestra gained notoriety in the 1920s at the Indiana Theatre and the Columbia Club and made radio broadcasts on WLW and WFBM where many of their recordings were made. The band had close connections with the Royal Peacocks, the Jean Goldkette orchestra, and Hoagy Carmichael.

The band went toured in the 1920s and 1930s, performing at the Brooklyn Paramount Theatre and the New York Paramount Theatre, sharing billing with Duke Ellington and Rubinoff. When the band played at the Paramount in New York City in 1930, the leader singer was Dick Powell.

With the advent of the Great Depression, the band and its band members found the market for small and large orchestras change overnight and could not weather the shock of fewer bookings. It disbanded in 1929. Davis wrote about the band in his memoir That Band from Indiana (1982).

Personnel
 Charlie Davis – piano, trumpet, bandleader
 Ralph Hayes – trumpet
 Harry Wiliford – trumpet and vocals
 Charlie Fach – trombone
 Phil Davis – trombone
 Ray Shonfield – saxophone
 Kenny Knot – piano
 Jack Drummond – double bass
 Ralph Lillard – drums and composer
 Lewis Lowe – vocals
 Dick Powell – vocals

Discography
 "There's No End to My Love for You" (Vocalion, 1928)
 "When" (Vocalion, 1928)
 "The Drag" (Vocalion, 1928)
 "You're a Real Sweetheart" (Vocalion, 1928)
 "Just Like a Melody Out of the Sky" (Vocalion, 1928)
 "You're A Real Sweetheart" (Vocalion, 1928)
 "Suppose Nobody Cared" (Brunswick, 1928)
 "Mean to Me" (Gennett, 1929)
 "I Never Had A Chance/Rollin' Home" (1934)

References

American bandleaders
American jazz bandleaders
American jazz ensembles from Indiana
Big bands
Swing ensembles
Territory bands
Musical groups from Indiana
Gennett Records artists
Musical groups disestablished in 1929